was a feudal domain under the Tokugawa shogunate of Edo period Japan, located in Izumi Province in what is now the southern  portion of modern-day Osaka Prefecture. It was centered around the Hakata jin'ya which was located in what is now the city of Izumi and was controlled by the fudai daimyō Watanabe clan throughout all of its history.

History
Watanabe Yoshitsune (1611-1668) was the fifth son of Watanabe Shigetsuna, one of Tokugawa Ieyasu's generals. Starting as a 3250 koku hatamoto in 1611, he serving in numerous posts within the administration of the Tokugawa shogunate, and by 1661 had amassed fiefs with an additional kokudaka 10,000 koku, mostly in Kawachi and Izumi Provinces, which elevated him to the ranks of the daimyō. He established his seat at his original holding at Nomoto in Hiki District, Musashi Province, so the domain was initially styled . His son, Watanabe Masatsuna had no direct heir, and the third daimyō Watanabe Mototsuna was adopted from the main branch of the family. 

In 1698, Watanabe Mototsuna relocated his seat from Musashi to Izumi Province to better administrate the bulk of his holdings, and established a new jin'ya in what is now Minami-ku, Sakai. The domain was renamed  after this new location. However, in 1727, Watanabe Mototsuna decided to relocate once again. The jin'ya was moved to a location within what is now the city of Izumi, and the domain was renamed Hakata Domain. His successors would remain at the location until the Meiji restoration.  During the Boshin War the domain sided with the new Meiji government. In 1871, the domain became Hakata Prefecture with the abolition of the han system , and subsequently was merged into Sakai Prefecture and then Osaka Prefecture. 

The final daimyō of Hakata, Watanabe Akitsuna received the kazoku peerage title of Viscount in 1884.

Holdings at the end of the Edo period
As with most domains in the han system, Hakata Domain consisted of several discontinuous territories calculated to provide the assigned kokudaka, based on periodic cadastral surveys and projected agricultural yields. 

Izumi Province 
12 villages in Ōtori District
4 villages in Izumi District
Kawachi Province
5 villages in Furuichi District
5 villages in Shiki District
2 villages in Tanboku District
Ōmi Province
1 village in Kurita District
2 villages in Yasu District
2 villages in Gamo District
6 villages in Takashima District

List of daimyō 

{| class=wikitable
! #||Name || Tenure || Courtesy title || Court Rank || kokudaka ||Location
|-
|colspan=6|  Watanabe clan, 1661-1871 (Fudai)
|-
||1||||1661 - 1668||Tango-no-kami (丹後守)|| Junior 5th Rank, Lower Grade (従五位下)||13,500 koku||Nomoto Domain
|-
||2||||1668 - 1680||Etchu-no-kami (越中守)|| Junior 5th Rank, Lower Grade (従五位下)||13,500 koku||Nomoto Domain
|-
||3||||1698 - 1698||Bitchu-no-kami (備中守)|| Junior 5th Rank, Lower Grade (従五位下)||13,500 koku|| Obadera Domain
|-
||1||||1698 - 1727||Bitchu-no-kami (備中守)|| Junior 5th Rank, Lower Grade (従五位下)||13,500 koku||Nomoto Domain
|-
||1||||1727 - 1728||Bitchu-no-kami (備中守)|| Junior 5th Rank, Lower Grade (従五位下)||13,500 koku||Hakata Domain
|-
||2||||1728 - 1767||Etchu-no-kami (越中守)|| Junior 5th Rank, Lower Grade (従五位下)||13,500 koku||Hakata Domain
|-
||3||||1767 - 1772||Buzen-no-kami (豊前守)|| Junior 5th Rank, Lower Grade (従五位下)||13,500 koku||Hakata Domain
|-
||4||||1772 - 1783||Tango-no-kami (丹後守)|| Junior 5th Rank, Lower Grade (従五位下)||13,500 koku||Hakata Domain
|-
||5||||1783 - 1793||Suruga-no-kami (駿河守)|| Junior 5th Rank, Lower Grade (従五位下)||13,500 koku||Hakata Domain
|-
||6||||1793 - 1810||Daigaku-no-kami (大学頭)|| Junior 5th Rank, Lower Grade (従五位下)||13,500 koku||Hakata Domain
|-
||7||||1810 - 1828||Etchu-no-kami (越中守)|| Junior 5th Rank, Lower Grade (従五位下)||13,500 koku||Hakata Domain
|-
||8||||1828 - 1847||Tango-no-kami (丹後守)|| Junior 5th Rank, Lower Grade (従五位下)||13,500 koku||Hakata Domain
|-
||9||||1847 - 1871||Tango-no-kami (丹後守)|| 4th Rank (正四位)||13,500 koku||Hakata Domain
|-
|-
|}

See also 
 List of Han
 Abolition of the han system

Further reading
 Bolitho, Harold. (1974). Treasures Among Men: The Fudai Daimyo in Tokugawa Japan. New Haven: Yale University Press.  ;  OCLC 185685588

References

Domains of Japan
1601 establishments in Japan
States and territories established in 1661
1871 disestablishments in Japan
States and territories disestablished in 1871
Izumi Province
History of Osaka Prefecture